is a 1980 Japanese film directed by Yōichi Higashi.

Cast
 Setsuko Karasuma as Natsuko
 Morio Kazama as Kanamori
 Hirotarō Honda as Nakagaki
 Shōhei Hino as Kawamoto
 Masumi Okada as Takahito Mori
 Nobuko Miyamoto as Mariko

Awards
5th Hochi Film Award
 Won: Best Supporting Actress - Yoko Aki
2nd Yokohama Film Festival
 Won: Best Supporting Actor - Morio Kazama

References

1980 films
Films directed by Yōichi Higashi
1980s Japanese films